Manidhanum Mirugamum is a 1953 Indian Tamil-language film, directed by K. Vembu and S. D. Sundharam. The film stars Sivaji Ganesan, Madhuri Devi, N. N. Kannappa and K. Sarangapani. No print of the film is known to survive, making it a lost film.

Plot

Cast 
Sivaji Ganesan
Madhuri Devi
N. N. Kannappa
K. Sarangapani
T. R. Ramachandran
M. N. Rajam
S. D. Sundharam
 K. S. Chandra

Soundtrack 
The music was composed by G. Govindarajulu Naidu. Lyrics by S. D. Sundharam. Singer is T. R. Ramachandran. Playback singers are C. S. Jayaraman, A. M. Rajah, M. M. Mariappa, M. L. Vasanthakumari, Radha Jayalakshmi and Jikki.

Release 
Manidhanum Mirugamum was released on 4 December 1953. The distribution rights were initially with Gokilam Pictures, but later transferred to Gaiety Pictures Circuit.

References

External links 
 

1950s lost films
1950s Tamil-language films
1953 films
Lost Indian films